Senator Duffield may refer to:

William E. Duffield (1922–2001), Pennsylvania State Senate
William Ward Duffield (1823–1907), Michigan State Senate